The Tour de Romandie Féminin is a women's cycle stage race in Switzerland, part of the UCI Women's World Tour. The race runs through the Romandie region, or French-speaking part of Switzerland - using roads in the Jura mountains and Alpine mountain ranges.

History 
The Tour de Romandie is a longstanding men's stage race, being first held in 1947 to celebrate the 50 year anniversary of Swiss Cycling. In 2022, the organisation behind the race announced that Tour de Romandie Féminin would be held for the first time in 2022 - as part of the celebrations of 75 years of the race.

The first event was held in October 2022, over 3 days. The first stage was a circuit race in Lausanne, the second stage was from Sion to the ski resort of Thyon 2000 and the final stage was from Fribourg to Geneva - where the first men's Tour de Romandie ended in 1947. The first edition was won by Ashleigh Moolman-Pasio of SD Worx.

Winners

External links

References 

Tour de Romandie
Cycle races in Switzerland
Women's road bicycle races
Annual sporting events in Switzerland
Recurring sporting events established in 2022
2022 establishments in Switzerland
UCI Women's World Tour races